310th may refer to:

310th Air Division, inactive United States Air Force organization
310th Air Refueling Squadron, inactive United States Air Force unit
310th Airlift Squadron (310 AS), part of the 6th Air Mobility Wing at MacDill Air Force Base, Florida
310th Fighter Squadron (310 FS), part of the 56th Operations Group at Luke Air Force Base, Arizona
310th Space Wing, United States Air Force unit assigned to the Air Force Reserve Command Tenth Air Force

See also
310 (number)
310, the year 310 (CCCX) of the Julian calendar
310 BC